Yann Rocherieux (born 13 January 1983) is a French yacht racer who competed in the 2008 Summer Olympics in the skiff event with Emmanuel Dyen finishing 10th.

References

1983 births
Living people
French male sailors (sport)
Olympic sailors of France
Sailors at the 2008 Summer Olympics – 49er